Järnforsen is a locality situated in Hultsfred Municipality, Kalmar County, Sweden, with a population of 489 in 2010.

South of Järnforsen, in Slättemossa, there is a deposit of orbicular granite.

References 

Populated places in Kalmar County
Populated places in Hultsfred Municipality